Beethoven's 3rd is a 2000 American comedy film, and the third installment in the Beethoven film series. It is the first film in the series to be released directly to video and to receive a G rating from the Motion Picture Association of America. The film marks the onscreen introduction of Judge Reinhold as George Newton's younger brother Richard (first mentioned in the original film), Julia Sweeney as Richard's wife Beth, Joe Pichler as Richard's son Brennan, and Michaela Gallo as Richard's daughter Sara.

Plot 
Richard Newton, George's brother, prepares for a road trip from Denver, Colorado, to a Newton family reunion in California with his wife Beth and children Sara and Brennan. He models the entire vacation based on a memorable family road trip from his childhood in 1967, and rents a large, state-of-the-art RV for the occasion. Before the family leaves, they receive a cage from George containing Beethoven, who Richard's family is supposed to deliver to California as Beethoven's owners are stuck in Europe. Beth and Brennan disapprove of the plan, and Beth convinces Richard to leave Beethoven at a dog kennel until George can retrieve him.

Meanwhile, criminal hackers Tommy and William visit a video store in an attempt to buy a DVD of The Shakiest Gun in the West, having previously hidden a stolen computer code on it for an unknown party, only to learn that Richard has already bought it for the trip. After obtaining Richard's address, Tommy and William drive to the house and spy on them; their bumbling antics catches Beethoven's attention before the Newton family leaves with him. Beethoven is dropped off at the kennel, but after spotting Tommy and William tailing the Newtons, he escapes and stows away on the RV's boat when the vehicle briefly stops. Beethoven is later discovered by Richard when the family reaches their first destination, and Beth reluctantly agrees to bring him along for the rest of the trip.

The road trip is plagued by several mishaps in which Beethoven causes the Newtons problems and forces Richard to pay for any instances of damage caused by the St. Bernard. Unbeknownst to them, all of the mishaps were started by Tommy and William's constant attempts at stealing the DVD, with Beethoven causing the damages in the process of protecting the Newtons. Meanwhile, Brennan begins to bond with Beethoven after Beethoven allows him to socialize with a girl using the same trip route as him. During one stop, William breaks open the RV's windshield with a brick while the Newtons are away, with the damage being blamed on Beethoven. Finally, Richard snaps and admits that his childhood road trip was actually terrible, but that he had been praising it in an effort to forget how terrible it was.

While staying the night at a hotel, Sara decides to sleep with Beethoven in the RV. The next day, Tommy and William, at this point mentally unbalanced from their encounters with Beethoven, break into the RV and steal it with Beethoven and Sara still inside. Brennan sees this, alerts Richard and Beth to Tommy and William's presence who then call the cops with Richard hopping in a police car with an officer to follow Tommy and William. During the chaos, William accidentally knocks himself out with a homemade tranquilizer designed for Beethoven. Tommy subdues Beethoven and attempts to grab Sara, but Sara successfully orders Beethoven to sit on an emergency brake button. This stops the still-moving RV and sends Tommy dangling out of the broken windshield. Afterwards, Sara is reunited with the rest of the Newtons, Tommy and William are both arrested, and the DVD with the computer code is confiscated. Beth admits she was wrong about Beethoven and realized that he truly was protecting the family all along.

The Newtons arrive at the family reunion, despondent at the prospect of giving Beethoven back to George. They find out from Richard's Uncle Morrie that George and his family will not be attending the reunion because of unexpected business problems in Slovakia, which means they have to watch over Beethoven for a whole year, with George promising to pay for everything. Then, to Beth's despair, Morrie tells the Newtons to bring two more St. Bernards along when they drive back home.

Cast 
 Judge Reinhold as Richard Newton
 Julia Sweeney as  Beth Newton
 Joe Pichler as  Brennan Newton
 Michaela Gallo as  Sara Newton
 Mike Ciccolini as  Tommy
 Jamie Marsh as Bill (William)
 Danielle Keaton (as Danielle Weiner) as Penny
 Frank Gorshin as  Morrie Newton
 Holly Mitchell as  Kennel Employee
 Greg Pitts as Quentin

Reception
On Rotten Tomatoes the film has a score of 0% based on reviews from 7 critics.

References

External links 
 

2000 films
American comedy road movies
2000s English-language films
2000s comedy road movies
Films about dogs
Films about pets
Direct-to-video sequel films
Universal Pictures direct-to-video films
Films directed by David M. Evans
Films about vacationing
Films about animals
Films set in the United States
2000 comedy films
Beethoven (franchise)
2000s American films